The Interest is an upcoming Thai film starring Vachirawit Chivaaree and Urassaya Sperbund. It will be directed by Waasuthep Ketpetch and produced by Parbdee Taweesuk. The film is an official remake of Han Dong-wook's 2014 South Korean film Man in Love. The story is about a debt collector who falls in love with a woman struggling to take care of her ailing father due to financial issues.

Plot
A low-level debt collector (Bright) goes around the neighborhood streets harassing shop owners and collecting debts for the loan shark he works for. He encounters a simple woman (Yaya) struggling to take care of her ailing father and his hospital bills. She has a huge debt, so he strikes a deal with her to repay it, asking a favor to date him in return. He eventually falls in love with her, but discovers that he has a terminal illness.

Casts

Main cast
 Vachirawit Chivaaree (Bright)
 Urassaya Sperbund (Yaya)

Pre-production 
On 22 November 2022,  GMMTV introduced one film The Interest during their "Diversely Yours" event at Union Hall Bangkok. The trailer which was shoot within a day at Pattaya, received a positive response. Shooting will start around mid-2023. Information on supporting cast and the exact release date is currently unknown.

Previously, Sataporn Panichraksapong, managing director of GMMTV announced to invest 51% stake in Parbdee Taweesuk Co. Ltd. to extend its business model. The expectation is to build potential to create quality series/films and improve Thai market's visibility around the globe. Producers Kamthorn Lorjitramnuay, Puchong Tuntisungwaragul, and Patha Thongpan represent Parbdee Taweesuk.

References

External links 
 Official Trailer
 

Upcoming films
2023 films
Thai action films
GMMTV
2023 action films
2023 romance films
Thai romance films